The year 2003 was the 32nd year after the independence of Bangladesh. It was also the third year of the third term of the Government of Khaleda Zia.

Incumbents

 President: Iajuddin Ahmed
 Prime Minister: Khaleda Zia
 Chief Justice: Mainur Reza Choudhury (until 22 June), Khondokar Mahmud Hasan (starting 22 June)

Demography

Climate

Economy

Note: For the year 2003 average official exchange rate for BDT was 58.15 per US$.

Events
9 January – The Operation Clean Heart came to an end. The Bangladesh Government passed an indemnity law that provided legal protection to security personnel who participated in the operation. Later, in November 2015 Bangladesh High Court declared the indemnity ordinance illegal and scrapped it.
17 January – A bomb attack at the Failya Paglar Mela in Tangail, Bangladesh that resulted in the death of 7 people.
20 January – Bangladesh wins the 2003 South Asian Football Federation Gold Cup.
8 July - A ferry named MV Nasrin-1 sunk in the Meghna River near Chandpur at midnight. Of the 750 people on board 220 were rescued.
27 July – 175 fishermen go missing after storms strike the coast of Bangladesh and 300 homes are destroyed in an earthquake which strikes Chittagong.

Awards and recognitions

Independence Day Award

Ekushey Padak
 Muhammad Shamsul Huq
 Muhammad Ekramul Huq
 Zebunnessa Rahman
 Zobeda Khanum
 Abdul Mannan Syed
 Al Mujahidi
 Anjuman Ara Begum
 Lokman Hossain Fakir
 Khan Ataur Rahman
 Abdul Hamid
 Nazim Uddin Mostan
 UNESCO

Sports
International football: 
 Bangladesh hosted the 2003 South Asian Football Federation Gold Cup in January and became the champions defeating the Maldives in the final, in front of 46,000 fans present at the Bangabandhu National Stadium. 
 In March Bangladesh played 2 matches at the 2004 AFC Asian Cup qualifiers against Hong Kong and Laos, failing to win a single match as they crashed out of the qualifiers bottom of their group.
 In November Bangladesh played 2 matches against Tajikistan in home and away system as part of 2006 FIFA World Cup qualification – AFC first round and lost both matches.
Domestic football: 
Muktijoddha Sangsad KC won the Dhaka League while Abahani Limited Dhaka became runner-up.
Muktijoddha Sangsad KC won National Football Championship while Mohammedan SC became runner-up.
Cricket:
The South African national cricket team toured Bangladesh in April and May and played a two-match Test series against the Bangladeshi national cricket team. South Africa won the Test series 2–0.
The Bangladesh national cricket team played two Test matches and three One Day International (ODI) matches on a mid-year tour of Australia in 2003. Australia easily won the two-match Test series. Bangladesh's performances' did not get any better during the ODI series—failing to score more than 147 in any innings—as Australia completed a clean-sweep.
The Bangladeshi national cricket team visited Pakistan in August to September 2003 and played a three-match Test series against the Pakistani national cricket team. Pakistan won the Test series 3–0. In addition, the teams played a five-match Limited Overs International (LOI) series which Pakistan won 5–0.
The English cricket team toured Bangladesh from 12 October to 12 November 2003, playing a two-match Test series and a three-match One Day International series; England won all five matches to take whitewashes in both series.

See also 
2000s in Bangladesh
List of Bangladeshi films of 2003
Timeline of Bangladeshi history

References

 
Bangladesh
Bangladesh